Arabian Golden Boot award for the top scorer in the Arabian Leagues, Established in 1979–80 by the Lebanese magazine event "Al Hadath Sports", The award is presented annually to the best scorer, (Consideration to the rate of the goals in the matches).

Winners 

Notes

Statistics

Top Players win

Top Clubs win

Top Nationality win

Top Leagues win

References

External links
Awards sporting event
Interview with Majed Abdullah scorer Arabs in 1981
Prince Sultan and the Golden Boot award for Hamza Idris 2000
Batistuta scorer Arabs in 2004
Clarify the editor in chief of the event magazine about award in 1990 and 1992

Arabian